X1, X-1 or X-one may refer to:

Transportation

Aircraft
 Bell X-1, the first aircraft to exceed the speed of sound in controlled level flight

Automobiles
 BMW X1, a 2009–present German subcompact luxury SUV
 Geely Yuanjing X1, a 2017–2021 Chinese mini crossover
 Lada X-1, a 1981 Soviet concept MPV
 McLaren X-1, a 2012 British one-off sports car based on the 12C
 Red Bull X1, the former name of the Red Bull X2010, a fictional car created for the game Gran Turismo 5
 Wrightspeed X1, a 2008 electric sports car prototype based on the Ariel Atom

Bus routes
 X1 (Metrobus), a bus route in Washington, District of Columbia, United States
 X1 (New York City bus), a bus route in New York City, New York, United States
 X1 Steel Link, a bus rapid transit service between Sheffield, Rotherham, and Maltby in England, United Kingdom
 Excel X1, a bus route from Lowestoft to Peterborough in England, United Kingdom
 X1 Glasgow–Hamilton, a former bus route in Scotland

Cycles
 Sinclair X-1, an electrically assisted faired recumbent bicycle
 Yamaha X-1, a commuter-style motorbike

Rail transport
 SL X1, a former Swedish commuter train built by ASEA
 LNER Class X1, a single locomotive rebuilt several times in its history

Watercraft
 X1 (dinghy), a fast, light-weight sailing dinghy designed for inland racing
 X-1 Submarine, the United States Navy's only midget submarine
 HM Submarine X1, a Royal Navy submarine

Technology
 Sharp X1, a Japanese home computer manufactured by the Sharp Corporation
 Xbox One, a video game console
 a one-lane PCI Express slot
 Cray X1, a supercomputer sold since 2003
 Electrologica X1, an early Dutch computer
 Sony Ericsson XPERIA X1, a mobile phone
 ThinkPad X1 Carbon, a high-end notebook computer released by Lenovo in 2012
 X1 (software company) formerly known as X1 Technologies, Inc.
 Tegra X1, a system on a chip released by Nvidia in 2015
 X1, an IPTV-based cable television hardware platform developed by Comcast

Arts, entertainment, and media
 X1 (band), a South Korean boy band formed through Produce X 101
 X1 (rapper) (1979–2007), American rapper
 X Minus One, a 1950s American radio show  
 X-Men (film), the first film in the X-Men franchise
 X-One, monthly magazine produced by Imagine Publishing

Other
 x −1, the multiplicative inverse of x (another way to denote 1⁄x, one divided by x)
 Cygnus X-1 and Scorpius X-1, two astronomical x-ray sources
 M82 X-1, a candidate intermediate-mass black hole detected in January 2006 
 United States patent X1, by Samuel Hopkins (inventor)
 X1 (Egyptian hieroglyph t), an extremely common alphabetic letter in the Ancient Egyptian alphabet

See also
 1X (disambiguation)